The 2015 6 Hours of Fuji was an endurance sports car racing event held at the Fuji Speedway, Oyama, Japan on 9–11 October 2015, and served as the sixth race of the 2015 FIA World Endurance Championship season. Porsche's Timo Bernhard, Brendon Hartley and Mark Webber won the race driving the No. 17 Porsche 919 Hybrid car.

Qualifying

Qualifying result
Pole position winners in each class are marked in bold.

 – The No. 50 Larbre Competition had its qualifying lap time deleted due to non-conformity of the car's fuel cell ventilation valve, but was allowed to start from the rear of the grid.

Race

Race result
Class winners in bold.

References

6 Hours of Fuji
Fuji
Fuji